Brayden Mitchell (born 21 January 1989 in Invercargill, New Zealand) is a New Zealand rugby union footballer. He plays as a hooker for Southland in the Mitre 10 Cup.

Playing career

Provincial Rugby

Mitchell, a product of the Southland academy system, made his debut for the Stags during the 2009 Air New Zealand Cup, and served as backup to Jason Rutledge after David Hall suffered a season-ending knee injury. He continued to apprentice behind Rutledge in the 2010 ITM Cup.

Mitchell transferred to Waikato for the 2014 ITM Cup but moved back to Southland for 2016.

A serious neck injury forced Mitchell to miss the entire 2018 Mitre 10 Cup season.

Super Rugby

Mitchell was selected to the Highlanders squad for the 2011 Super Rugby season, where he served as the team's 3rd choice hooker behind Jason Rutledge and Mahonri Schwalger and made 4 substitute appearances. He continued as the Highlanders 3rd choice hooker through 2014 before transferring to the Hurricanes for 2015, where he was a squad regular making 11 substitute appearances.

For 2017, Mitchell signed with the Chiefs.

International Play

Mitchell was a member of the 2009 New Zealand Under 20's who won the IRB Junior World Championship, and scored a try in the final against England after a brilliant pass from Stags teammate Alex Ryan.

External links
 Highlanders Profile
 New Zealand Under 20 Profile

1989 births
Living people
New Zealand rugby union players
Rugby union hookers
Highlanders (rugby union) players
Southland rugby union players
Waikato rugby union players
Hurricanes (rugby union) players
Rugby union players from Invercargill
People educated at Southland Boys' High School